Ragnar Gripe (September 9, 1883 – December 8, 1942) was a Swedish sailor who competed in the 1912 Summer Olympics. He was a crew member of the Swedish boat R. S. Y. C., which finished fifth in the 8 metre class competition.

References

External links
profile

1883 births
1942 deaths
Swedish male sailors (sport)
Sailors at the 1912 Summer Olympics – 8 Metre
Olympic sailors of Sweden